Wild Edric's Way is a waymarked long distance footpath running wholly within the county of Shropshire in England.

The route
The route runs from Church Stretton in the Shropshire Hills AONB to Ludlow. It is named for Eadric the Wild.

From Stretton it climbs up the Long Mynd, and Stiperstones descending to Bishops Castle using both a medieval drovers' road, the Portway and Offa's Dyke Path to reach quiet Clun and Norman Clun Castle before traversing the Iron Age hillfort at Bury Ditches and heading to Craven Arms and finally Ludlow, the centre of the Welsh Marches.

External links
 Long Distance Walkers' Association
 

 

Long-distance footpaths in England
Footpaths in Shropshire